Bill R. Thompson (born 2 April 1949) is a former Australian rules footballer who played for Essendon in the Victorian Football League (VFL) during the late 1960s.

Nicknamed 'Sherry', Thompson spent three seasons playing with Essendon and was a member of their reserves premiership winning team in 1968. He served in Vietnam after being drafted into the army.

The second stage of the half back flanker's career took place in the Victorian Football Association (VFA) and he captained Williamstown in 1975, his fourth and final season at the club. He crossed to Dandenong in 1976 and the following year won the J. J. Liston Trophy. A VFA representative, Thompson left the league after the 1979 season and continued playing throughout the 1980s with the Frankston Bombers.

References

Holmesby, Russell and Main, Jim (2007). The Encyclopedia of AFL Footballers. 7th ed. Melbourne: Bas Publishing.

1949 births
Living people
Essendon Football Club players
Dandenong Football Club players
Williamstown Football Club players
J. J. Liston Trophy winners
Australian rules footballers from Victoria (Australia)